Prevention of Accidents (Seafarers) Convention, 1970 is  an International Labour Organization Convention.

It was established in 1970:
Noting the terms of existing international labour Conventions and Recommendations applicable to work on board ship and in port and relevant to the prevention of occupational accidents to seafarers, and in particular of the Labour Inspection (Seamen) Recommendation, 1926, the Prevention of Industrial Accidents Recommendation, 1929, the Protection against Accidents (Dockers) Convention (Revised), 1932, the Medical Examination (Seafarers) Convention, 1946, and the Guarding of Machinery Convention and Recommendation, 1963, and

Noting the terms of the Safety of Life at Sea Convention, 1960, and the Regulations annexed to the International Load Line Convention, as revised in 1966, which provide for a number of safety measures on board ship which provide protection for persons employed thereon, and

Having decided upon the adoption of certain proposals with regard to accident prevention on board ship at sea and in port,...

Ratifications
As of 2022, the convention had been ratified by 29 states. Of the ratifying states, 19 had subsequently denounced the treaty.

External links 
Text
Ratifications

Health treaties
International Labour Organization conventions
Occupational safety and health treaties
Treaties concluded in 1970
Treaties entered into force in 1973
Treaties of Azerbaijan
Treaties of Belize
Treaties of Brazil
Treaties of Costa Rica
Treaties of Egypt
Treaties of West Germany
Treaties of Guinea
Treaties of Israel
Treaties of Italy
Treaties of Japan
Treaties of Kenya
Treaties of Kyrgyzstan
Treaties of Mexico
Treaties of New Zealand
Treaties of Nigeria
Treaties of the Socialist Republic of Romania
Treaties of Tajikistan
Treaties of Tanzania
Treaties of Turkey
Treaties of Uruguay
Admiralty law treaties
1970 in labor relations